Il prefetto di ferro (internationally released as I Am the Law and The Iron Prefect) is a 1977 Italian  drama film directed by Pasquale Squitieri. The film tells the story of Cesare Mori, an Italian prefect that before and during the Fascist period was best known as "the Iron Prefect", and it is based on the biographic book with the same name written by Arrigo Petacco. The film shared with In nome del Papa Re the 1978 David di Donatello for Best Film. The film was well-received but also criticized for subtly downplaying Mori's fascism.

Plot
In 1925, Prefect Cesare Mori is sent by Mussolini to Palermo with special powers to fight the Mafia. Mori is not a Fascist, having fought against the ras Arpinati in the early twenties. Aided by police officer Francesco Spanò, he visits the house of mafia boss Antonio Capecelatro, and shoots him dead with a headshot on his balcony. He later organizes the siege of the town of Gangi, which culminates with the arrest and suicide of Don Calogero Albanese, fugitive for more than 40 years. The Prefect continues, undaunted in his work, frightening the Mafiosi who are trying to kill him.

Through the will left by an old man living in the poorhouse, he becomes acquainted with the lawyer Galli, chief hierarch of the Sicilian Fascists and the Minister of the Interior. Mori is appointed as a senator and leaves for Rome.

Cast
Giuliano Gemma: Cesare Mori
Claudia Cardinale: Anna Torrisi 
Stefano Satta Flores: Spanò 
Francisco Rabal: Albanese the bandit
Lina Sastri: Woman of Gangi
Massimo Mollica: Paterno
 Rik Battaglia: Antonio Capecelatro
 Paul Müller
 Vittorio Duse
 Enzo Fiermonte

Releases
Wild East released this on a limited edition R0 NTSC DVD under its English title "I Am the Law" alongside The Day of the Owl, under the title "Mafia", in 2010.

References

External links

1977 films
Italian drama films
1970s Italian-language films
Films set in Sicily
Films directed by Pasquale Squitieri
Films scored by Ennio Morricone
Films with screenplays by Ugo Pirro
1970s Italian films